The Dusty Foot Philosopher is the first studio album by the Somali-Canadian rapper K'naan after previously releasing a mixtape. It was released by BMG Music on June 7, 2005, in Canada and on June 23, 2005, in the United States.

Awards
The album won the Juno Award for Rap Recording of the Year in 2006 and was shortlisted for the 2006 Polaris Music Prize. He also was nominated for an mtvU award for most downloads of his song, "Soobax". In November 2007, the album was included in The Guardian'''s list of 1000 Albums to Hear Before You Die. The album was put at 194 on Rollingstone's Top 200 Greatest Rap Albums of All Time. 

Soundtracks
"In the Beginning" is part of the soundtrack of the 2008 comedy Harold & Kumar Escape from Guantanamo Bay. This song also gives the title for episode 7 of the fifth season of True Blood, appearing in the closing credits of the episode. "Soobax" was used on the soundtrack for the video game FIFA 06''.

Track listing

References

2005 albums
K'naan albums
Bertelsmann Music Group albums
Juno Award for Rap Recording of the Year recordings